Karaberd or K’araberd may refer to:
Karaberd, Lori, Armenia
Karaberd, Shirak, Armenia